A dip or dipping sauce is a common condiment for many types of food.  Dips are used to add flavor or texture to a food, such as pita bread, dumplings, crackers, chopped raw vegetables, fruits, seafood, cubed pieces of meat and cheese, potato chips, tortilla chips, falafel, and sometimes even whole sandwiches in the case of jus. Unlike other sauces, instead of applying the sauce to the food, the food is typically placed or dipped into the sauce.

Dips are commonly used for finger foods, appetizers, and other food types. Thick dips based on sour cream, crème fraîche, milk, yogurt, mayonnaise, soft cheese, or beans are a staple of American hors d'oeuvres and are thicker than spreads, which can be thinned to make dips.

Dips in various forms are eaten all over the world and people have been using sauces for dipping for thousands of years.

List of dips

Some types of dip include:
 Ajika, a spicy, subtly flavoured dip in Caucasian cuisine, based on hot red pepper, garlic, herbs and spices
 Ajvar, made from red bell peppers with garlic, found in Bosnian cuisine and Serbian cuisine
 Artichoke dip
 Baba ghanoush, a dip made from eggplant, popular in the Eastern Mediterranean and parts of South Asia
 Bagna càuda, a regional dish of the Italian Piedmont
 Banana ketchup, a Filipino condiment made from bananas; used similar to tomato ketchup
 Barbecue sauce, often used for grilled and fried meats in the United States
 Bean dip, dip made from refried beans
 Blue cheese dressing, commonly used as a dip for raw vegetables or buffalo wings
 Buffalo sauce, often used as both a coating for buffalo wings as well as a standalone dipping sauce for other foods
 Cheese sauce
 Chile con queso, used in Tex Mex cuisine with tortilla chips
 Chili oil, used as a dipping sauce for meat and dim sum
 Chimichurri, a dip from Argentina made of parsley, garlic, and oregano
 Chocolate, a dip for various fruits, doughnuts, profiteroles and marshmallows
 Chogochujang, a variant of gochujang. A dip for seafood including hoe, oyster, and wakame, or for raw vegetables.
 Chutney, used with snacks like deep fried samosas and pakoras, dosa and idli
 Clam dip, a kind of condiment for dipping crackers and chips
 Cocktail sauce, a dip for seafood made from ketchup or chili sauce and horseradish
 Comeback sauce, a dip for chicken fingers made from mayonnaise and chili sauce
 Crab dip, a thick dip popular in Maryland usually made from cream cheese and lump crab meat
 Curry ketchup, also called Currygewürzketchup in Germany, is a spicier form of ketchup
 Duck sauce, a modern variation of plum sauce
 Fish sauce (garum), or nam pla, used in southeastern Asian cuisines as a dip for snacks and other foods
 Fish paste or bagoong, fermented fish paste, used in southeastern Asian cuisines as a dip for rice dishes
 Fondue, a blend of melted cheese and wine in which bread is dipped
 French onion dip
 Fritessaus, a leaner form of mayonnaise from The Netherlands
 Fry sauce, a dip eaten with french fries, onion rings, chicken strips, and other deep fried foods 
 Garlic butter sauce, used for dipping seafood, chicken, beef and pizza; plain clarified butter or drawn butter are more common with lobster, crab or clams
 Gravy, used as a dipping sauce for bread, such as in Maghreb cuisine
 Guacamole, avocadoes mashed with lime juice, onions, tomatoes, and herbs; commonly eaten with tortilla chips
 Hazelnut butter or hazelnut spread is commonly used as a dip for crackers and cookies
 Honey, a common dip for chicken and biscuits
 Honey mustard
 Horseradish sauce, often with horseradish mixed with sour cream and/or mayonnaise 
 Hot sauce or chili sauce, a spicy dip made from peppers
 Hummus, a Levantine dip of ground chickpeas and sesame tahini with spices and lemon juice
 Jus, a meat broth often served with sandwiches such as French dip and Italian beef
 Ketchup (also called catsup or tomato sauce), often used with french fries, onion rings, and a wide variety of other foods
 Kiwi onion dip, a New Zealand snack food served with potato chips, crackers, or chopped vegetables
 Marinara sauce, a tomato sauce served with breadsticks, pizza, etc.
 Mayonnaise, the basis for many dips, on its own a dip for cold chicken; vegetables; french fries; and seafood
 Mexicali dip, sour cream-based with Mexican cuisine-inspired spices
 Mint sauce, a sauce made with ground mint leaves and vinegar or yogurt 
 Mkhali (colloquially pkhali), Georgian vegetable purées thickened with walnut paste and often rolled into balls
 Muhammara, a Near Eastern hot pepper and walnut dip
 Mustard, ground seeds of the mustard plant; variants are used in Asian cuisine
 Nacho cheese dip, for dipping tortilla chips
 Nam chim, Thai dipping sauces which most often contain chili peppers
 Nam phrik, Thai chili pastes which are also used as dips for vegetables and fried fish
 Nước chấm (Vietnamese) and Prik Nam Pla (Thai), mixes of chili peppers and fish sauce
 Pebre, a Chilean mix of tomato, onion, chile, and coriander
 Pimento cheese
 Plum sauce, used for dipping fried noodles, dumplings, and other foods
 Ranch dressing, buttermilk flavored salad dressing popular in the United States
 Remoulade, often used with fried foods such as fish, or chips (french fries or fries)
 Romesco, used as a dip or as a condiment for other dishes
 Salsa, used often with tortilla chips
 Sambal, for fish, chicken, etc.
 Satsivi, a walnut dip in Georgian cuisine
 Smetana, a common dip for bliny, pelmeni, vareniki
 Sour cream, on its own or combined with mayonnaise and/or other ingredients, a common dip for potato chips
 Soy sauce, often served in small saucers for dipping a variety of East Asian foods; for sushi and sashimi, prepared wasabi is mixed in
 Spinach dip, for tortilla chips and vegetables
 Sriracha sauce
 Sweet and sour sauce, a generic term for many styles of sauce
 Taramosalata, a Near Eastern dip of carp or codfish roe
 Tartar sauce, commonly used with seafood
 Tentsuyu, a Japanese dipping sauce
 Tirokafteri, a feta-based Greek meze
 Tkemali, a cherry plum sauce in Georgian cuisine
 Toyomansi, a Filipino meat or fish dip made with soy sauce and calamansi juice; chilis may also be added to create "silimansi"
 Tzatziki and similar sauces used for dipping include tarator and Raita
 Vinegar, used as a dip for grilled meats, and steamed crabs; Balsamic vinegar is also commonly used as a dipping sauce for bread
 Vin Santo, into which cantucci (biscotti) are dipped

See also

 Chips and dip
 List of food pastes
 List of foods
 List of sauces
 List of spreads
 Paste (food)
 Condiment
 Chutney

References

Sauces
 
World cuisine